Sunshine Rock is the 13th solo album from American rock musician Bob Mould, formerly frontman of the bands Hüsker Dü and Sugar. The album release was announced on October 24, 2018. The album was released on February 8, 2019, and debuted at number 192 on the US Billboard 200. A review in Dagger says ""I Fought" has all the rage and bluster that Husker Du ever had (same with the great "Sin King") while "Camp Sunshine" is, dare I say a flowery love song[.] Sunshine Rock shows Bob and his unbeatable rhythm section at the top of their game." Robert Christgau wrote "this is the first time the solo Mould has come close to what he was once capable of, and that he's managed it this late should encourage us all."

Track listing

Personnel
Bob Mould – guitars, vocals, keyboards, percussion, production, orchestral arrangements
Jason Narducy – bass, backing vocals
Jon Wurster – drums, percussion
Alison Chesley – cello on "Western Sunset", orchestral score transcriptions
Czech Studio Orchestra – cellos, violas, violins
Paul Martens – transcription consultant
Mikel Toms – orchestra conductor
Jan Košulič – orchestra engineer

Charts

References

2019 albums
Albums produced by Bob Mould
Bob Mould albums
Merge Records albums